Lung Kwu Chau (also previously transliterated as Tung Koo, Tung Koo, Toon Oo or Toon-quoo) is an island at the northwest water of Hong Kong. It is off the shore of Lung Kwu Tan near Tuen Mun in the mainland New Territories, separated by waterway of Urmston Road.

The island is formed of Hong Kong granite and is unoccupied.

History
The earliest cultural remains of the Lung Kwu Chau Archaeological Site can be dated to the middle phase of the Neolithic (c. 4000-2000 BC), representing the beginning of cultural history in the Hong Kong area.

Lung Kwu Chau is clearly marked in O Livro de Francisco Rodrigues, written in 1514.

Conservation
Since 1996, the island, together with Sha Chau and Pak Chau are within the boundaries of the Sha Chau and Lung Kwu Chau Marine Park. The three island have been listed as a Site of Special Scientific Interest since 1979. It is known as a dolphin sanctuary where is the habitat for the Chinese white dolphin.

See also

Islands of Hong Kong
Outlying Islands

References

External links

Environment study from WWF HK 
Aerial image from Google Map
 

Uninhabited islands of Hong Kong
Tuen Mun District
Islands of Hong Kong